Mark van Eeghen (born April 19, 1952)
is an American former professional football player who was a running back for ten years in the National Football League (NFL), including making two Super Bowl appearances. He played eight seasons for the Oakland Raiders (1974–1981) and then two with the New England Patriots (1982–1983). Van Eeghen rushed for over 1,000 yards in three consecutive seasons from 1976-1978.

Student athlete
Prior to his professional career, he played high school football at Cranston High School West, from which he graduated in 1970, after earning all-state football honors as a senior.
He then played at Colgate University, where he obtained a Bachelor of Arts degree in economics in 1974.  While at Colgate, he set the school's single-season rushing record in 1973 with 1,089 yards.  In his three college seasons, van Eeghen rushed for 2,591 yards and 27 touchdowns, while also catching 31 passes for 361 yards and 2 scores.  van Eeghen was inducted into Colgate's Hall of Fame in 1980.

Career
Van Eeghen took over as Raider fullback from Marv Hubbard, also a Colgate alumnus.

Playing for Oakland in Super Bowl XV, he was the game's leading rusher with 75 yards on 18 carries.
He also won a championship ring with the Raiders in Super Bowl XI, and was the team's second leading rusher with 73 yards.  He left the Raiders in 1982 as their all-time leading rusher with 5,907 yards. 

His most noteworthy game as a Patriot was the infamous Snowplow Game. Patriots quarterback Steve Grogan only attempted five passes due to the snow and ice leaving the ground attack as the only offensive option. Van Eeghen rushed the ball 22 times for 100 yards in the 3-0 Patriots win.

Van Eeghen finished his 10 NFL seasons with 6,651 rushing yards, 174 receptions for 1,583 receiving yards, and 41 touchdowns (37 rushing and 4 receiving).

Awards
In 2002, van Eeghen was inducted into the Rhode Island Scholar-Athlete Hall of Fame in recognition of his career.
This reflected that he was voted fourth on a list of the top 50 Greatest Sports Figures by Sports Illustrated.

Family

Van Eeghen has three daughters, including Amber (born 1980), who joined the cheerleading squad of his last team, the Patriots.  Amber took part in two overseas tours with the Patriot cheerleaders to perform for U.S. troops in Japan, South Korea, Hawaii, Portugal, Turkey, Iceland, Germany and England.  She went to the University of Rhode Island, where she became captain of the "Ramettes" cheerleaders.  She is currently married to former  New England Patriots Pro Bowl center Dan Koppen.

References

1952 births
Living people
American football running backs
Colgate Raiders football players
Colgate University alumni
New England Patriots players
Oakland Raiders players
Sportspeople from Cambridge, Massachusetts
Sportspeople from Cranston, Rhode Island